

Events

Unknown date
 – Targeted completion of the Melbourne Airport rail link.
 – Earliest expected implementation of the Toronto Subway Line 2 East Extension.
 – Line D of the Prague Metro is expected to be completed from Pankrác to Písnice.
 – The Fehmarn Belt Fixed Link, an immersed road and rail tunnel, is expected to open for service. It will connect the Danish island of Lolland with the German island of Fehmarn across the Fehmarn Belt in the Baltic Sea.
 – Estimated completion of the Turin–Lyon high-speed railway, linking the Italian and French high-speed rail networks.
 – Stage 3 of the Jurong Region MRT line is expected to open.
 – California High-Speed Rail is planned to begin service in the Central Valley.
 – Estimated completion of the Northern Branch Corridor Project in New Jersey, which would extend the Hudson–Bergen Light Rail along a little-used freight rail right of way.
 – Earliest expected completion of the Bay Area Rapid Transit Silicon Valley extension through downtown San Jose, California.
 – The Chicago 'L' Red Line is planned to be extended to 130th Street as part of the Red Ahead program.
 – Earliest date the Capital Metropolitan Transportation Authority Blue Line light rail is expected to start operations in Austin, Texas. The project is funded by Project Connect.
 – Earliest date the Capital Metropolitan Transportation Authority Orange Line light rail is expected to start operations in Austin, Texas. The project is funded by Project Connect.

References